Johanna Töpfer, née Schrocko (3 April 1929 – 7 January 1990), was an East German politician and Deputy Director of the FDGB.

Biography 
Töpfer was born in Schneidemühl (Posen-West Prussia; today Piła, Poland) and started to work as a Waggon cleaner for the Deutsche Reichsbahn (East Germany) in 1945. She became a secretary in the cadre-department of the Reichsbahn administration in Leipzig and was educated at the teacher seminary at Dresden in 1951/52 with a correspondence course at the University of Berlin passing a graduation as Diplom-Wirtschaftlerin in 1955. Since 1952 Töpfer worked as a teacher and received her doctorate at the "Academy of Sociology at the Central Committee of the Socialist Unity Party of Germany (SED)".

Töpfer was a member of the Free German Trade Union Federation (FDGB) since 1945 and of the SED since 1949. In 1955 she became the deputy director of the FDGB-schools of Beesenstedt and Grünheide. Töpfer was a member of the executive board of the FDGB in 1956-59 and a member of the FDGB-presidium in 1968-89. She worked as a lecturer and later Professor at the FDGB-college "Fritz Heckert". In 1971 she also became a member of the Central Committee of the SED (until 1989) and in 1976 a member of the East German Parliament "Volkskammer". 

Töpfer committed suicide on 7 January 1990.

References

External links 
 

1929 births
1990 deaths
People from Piła
People from Posen-West Prussia
Socialist Unity Party of Germany politicians
Free German Trade Union Federation members
Members of the State Council of East Germany
Members of the 7th Volkskammer
Members of the 8th Volkskammer
Members of the 9th Volkskammer
Recipients of the National Prize of East Germany
Recipients of the Patriotic Order of Merit (honor clasp)
German politicians who committed suicide